The 2013 Galway Senior Hurling Championship was the 116th staging of the Galway Senior Hurling Championship since its establishment in 1887. The championship began on 28 April 2013 and ended on 28 October 2013.

St. Thomas's were the defending champions, however, they were defeated in the semi-final stage. Portumna won the title, following a 3-12 to 0-14 defeat of Loughrea in the final.

Results

Preliminary to Round 1

Round 1

Preliminary to Round 2

Round 2

Group A
{| class="wikitable"
!width=20|
! style="width:150px; text-align:left;"|Team
!width=20|
!width=20|
!width=20|
!width=20|
!width=30|
!width=40|
!width=20|
!width=20|
|- 
|1||align=left| Portumna
||3||2||0||1||3-57||4-35||19||4
|-
|2||align=left| St. Thomas'
||3||2||0||1||6-34||1-39||20||4
|-
|3||align=left| Clarinbridge
||3||1||1||1||2-37||3-43||9||3
|-
|4||align=left| Killimordaly
||3||0||1||2||2-36||6-57||-33||1
|}

Group B
{| class="wikitable"
!width=20|
!  style="width:150px; text-align:left"|Team
!width=20|
!width=20|
!width=20|
!width=20|
!width=30|
!width=40|
!width=20|
!width=20|
|- 
|1||align=left| Turloughmore
||3||2||1||0||5-55||3-48||13||5
|-
|2||align=left| Ardrahan
||3||2||0||1||4-48||4-49||-1||4
|-
|3||align=left|Gort
||3||1||1||1||4-51||5-39||8||3
|-
|4||align=left| Mullagh
||3||0||0||3||2-48||3-67||-22||0
|}

Group C
{| class="wikitable"
!width=20|
! style="width:150px; text-align:left"|Team
!width=20|
!width=20|
!width=20|
!width=20|
!width=30|
!width=40|
!width=20|
!width=20|
|- 
|1||align=left| Loughrea
||3||2||0||1||3-46||2-39||10||5
|-
|2||align=left| Castlegar
||3||2||0||1||4-47||5-40||5||5
|-
|3||align=left| Kinvara
||3||1||2||0||3-44||3-46||-2||2
|-
|4||align=left|Craughwell
||3||0||0||3||3-39||3-51||-12||0
|}

Group D
{| class="wikitable"
!width=20|
! style="width:150px; text-align:left"|Team
!width=20|
!width=20|
!width=20|
!width=20|
!width=30|
!width=40|
!width=20|
!width=20|
|- 
|1||align=left| Padraig Pearse's
||3||3||0||1||3-42||0-38||13||6
|-
|2||align=left| Beagh
||3||2||0||0||1-48||2-39||6||4
|-
|3||align=left| Kiltormer
||3||1||2||0||1-45||1-45||0||2
|-
|4||align=left|Tommy Larkin's
||3||0||0||3||1-36||3-49||-19||0
|}

Relegation play-offs

Group 1

Group 2

Quarter-finals

Semi-finals

Final

References

Galway Senior Hurling Championship
Galway Senior Hurling Championship